A by-election was held for the Australian House of Representatives seat of Wide Bay on 11 December 1915. This was triggered by the resignation of former Labor Party Prime Minister and MP Andrew Fisher.

The by-election was won by Commonwealth Liberal Party candidate Edward Corser by 43 votes, after the party previously did not contest the seat at the 1914 federal election — instead, the seat was contested by independent candidate John Austin, on 35.7 percent of the vote. Labor lost 14.5 percent of its vote from just over a year earlier.  Voting was not compulsory in 1915.

Results

See also
 List of Australian federal by-elections

References

1915 elections in Australia
Queensland federal by-elections
1910s in Queensland